Popoyo is a small beach town in the Tola municipality of the Rivas Department of Nicaragua.

The 1992 Nicaraguan tsunami 

On September 2, 1992, a magnitude 7.0 earthquake off the central coast of Nicaragua generated a tsunami that devastated Popoyo and many other communities on the Pacific coast. At least 116 people were killed, more than 68 missing and over 13,500 left homeless in Nicaragua. At least 1,300 houses and 185 fishing boats were destroyed along the west coast of Nicaragua.

Surfing 
Because of the country's consistent offshore winds surfing is a popular tourist attraction in the area.
Popoyo Outer Reef is the most challenging wave in the area, and is advised for experts only.  It is a powerful reef break that goes both left and right and offers long, powerful walls and sometimes a thick barrel section.
Playa Santana is a consistent beach break 20 minutes from the town of Popoyo.  
The Popoyo Surf Zone is a miracle of points, beach and reef breaks that capture the power of the frequent south swells and adds an all day dose of offshore winds funneling in from Lake Nicaragua to create great surf.

Geography

Climate 

Popoyo has a tropical savanna climate (Köppen climate classification Aw) with a short dry season from January to April and a lengthy wet season from May to October.

See also 
Tourism in Nicaragua

References

External links 
Surf Report for Popoyo
Official Site for Popoyo, NIcaragua
International Surfing Association
Live Surf Cam Popoyo & Outer Reef, Nicaragua
Magnific Rock, Nicaragua
Popoyo, Nicaragua

Populated places in Nicaragua
Populated coastal places in Nicaragua
Rivas Department